Belgrave Wanderers F.C. is a football club based on the Channel Island of Guernsey. They are affiliated to the Guernsey Football Association and play in the FNB Priaulx League.

History

The club first won the Priaulx League title in 1920 but it wasn't until the turn of the 21st century that they became a real force in the game on the island, winning the league five times between 2005 and 2014.

References

External links
 Official website

Football clubs in Guernsey